SMS Albatross was a gunboat of the Imperial German Navy launched and commissioned in 1871.  soon followed as her sister ship. She served as a gunboat overseas until she became a survey vessel in 1888. Struck from the list on 9 January 1899, she was sold and used as a collier until she foundered in a storm in March 1906.

References
 Erich Gröner, Panzerschiffe, Linienschiffe, Schlachtschiffe, Flugzeugträger, Kreuzer, Kanonenboote = Die deutschen Kriegsschiffe, 1815-1945 Vol.I, Bernard & Graefe, 1982, p. 162

Further reading

Albatross-class gunboats
1871 ships
Ships built in Danzig
Maritime incidents in 1906
Merchant ships of Germany